"Culpables" (Spanish for "Guilty") is a song by Colombian singer-songwriter Karol G and Puerto Rican rapper Anuel AA. It was written by Karol G, Anuel AA, Ovy On The Drums, Juan Rivera, Luis Rivera and Chris Jedi, and produced by the latter. The song was released on September 13, 2018 through Universal Music Latino, as the third single from her second studio album Ocean.

Background 

The song was first teased days prior to its official release through Karol G’s social media accounts, with multiple snippets of the song revealed. The song was released on September 13, 2018.

On an exclusive interview with Billboard (magazine), Karol G and Anuel AA revealed how the song came to be. Giraldo stated: "When "Ahora Me Llama" was out, I was looking for someone to do the remix. Among those people I was looking at was Anuel, who was in jail. We tried, but it was impossible to record it because of his situation. When he gets out of jail, he looked for me because he wanted to do the remix of "Pineapple", but I told him it was too late. "Mi Cama" was already out, and I said, "How about we work on a new song?""

Commercial performance 

"Culpables" debuted at number 11 on the US Billboard Hot Latin Songs chart dated September 29, 2018. On it’s seventeen week, the song reach it's peak at number 8 on the chart dated January 19, 2019. The song received a Latin diamond certification by the Recording Industry Association of America (RIAA) on April 11, 2019, for sales of 600,000 equivalent-units.

Awards and nominations

Music video
The music video of "Culpables" was directed by José-Emilio Sagaró and was released on Karol G's YouTube channel on September 13, 2018. As of January 2023, it has over 1.07 billion views and 4.4 million likes

Charts

Weekly charts

Year-end charts

Certifications

References

2018 singles
2018 songs
Anuel AA songs
Karol G songs
Spanish-language songs
Songs written by Karol G
Songs written by Anuel AA
Songs written by Chris Jedi